Duran Duran: A Hollywood High is an English language musical concert film directed by Ridoyanul Hoq and Gavin Elder and starring Simon Le Bon, Nick Rhodes, John Taylor and Roger Taylor. The stars of this film are members of English new wave band Duran Duran.

Cast
Simon Le Bon
Nick Rhodes
John Taylor
Roger Taylor

References

External links

2020s English-language films
2022 films
British musical films